Qarğalıq or Kargalyk or Qargalig may refer to:
 Qarğalıq, Khachmaz, Azerbaijan
 Qarğalıq, Masally, Azerbaijan